49-51 Kent Street, Millers Point is a heritage-listed residence located at 49-51 Kent Street, in the inner city Sydney suburb of Millers Point in the City of Sydney local government area of New South Wales, Australia. It was built from 1855 to 1862. The property was added to the New South Wales State Heritage Register on 2 April 1999.

History 
Millers Point is one of the earliest areas of European settlement in Australia, and a focus for maritime activities. This site was vacant in 1854 and these terraces were shown on a map . They remain largely intact.

Description 
Georgian style mid-Victorian face sandstone terrace in good condition. This residence has five bedrooms. Features of the terrace include attics with dormers, an arched passageway between dwellings, stone parapets and 12 pane windows. Storeys: Two; Construction: Face stone walls painted, rendered masonry parapet string course. Slate roof, painted brick chimney. Painted timber roof. Style: Victorian Georgian.

The external condition of the building is good.

Heritage listing 
As at 20 August 2015, this residence is one of a two large mid Victorian, face sandstone terraces in mostly intact condition.

It is part of the Millers Point Conservation Area, an intact residential and maritime precinct. It contains residential buildings and civic spaces dating from the 1830s and is an important example of C19th adaptation of the landscape.

49-51 Kent Street, Millers Point was listed on the New South Wales State Heritage Register on 2 April 1999.

See also 

Australian residential architectural styles
Alfred's Terrace: 37-47 Kent Street
53-55 Kent Street

References

Bibliography

Attribution

External links

 

New South Wales State Heritage Register sites located in Millers Point
Kent Street, Millers Point, 49-51
Houses in Millers Point, New South Wales
1862 establishments in Australia
Houses completed in 1862
Articles incorporating text from the New South Wales State Heritage Register
Georgian Revival architecture in Australia
Millers Point Conservation Area